Avi Schiffmann is an American web developer who built a widely seen website for worldwide information on the spread of SARS-CoV-2, the virus that causes COVID-19. He launched the website, called nCoV2019.live, in early January 2020. By late April 2020 over 600 million people had visited this website, which was getting about 30 million visitors each day.

Schiffmann began teaching himself how to code when he was seven years old, mostly by watching YouTube videos. In addition to his coronavirus tracker, Schiffmann has made more than 30 other websites. He was offered $8 million to put ads on his site, which he turned down.

Recognitions 
For his work, Schiffmann has been featured on numerous news outlets and was named Person of the Year at the 2020 Webby Awards.

Personal life 
Schiffmann is Jewish. Schiffmann's mother is a physician and his father is a biologist. He has a younger brother named Levi. Schiffmann is also an avid skier. He now attends Harvard University.

See also 

 Guillaume Rozier

References 

Living people
2002 births
People from Mercer Island, Washington
Web developers
21st-century American Jews